The counties of England are areas used for different purposes, which include administrative, geographical, cultural and political demarcation. The term "county" is defined in several ways and can apply to similar or the same areas used by each of these demarcation structures. These different types of county each have a more formal name but are commonly referred to as just "counties". The current arrangement is the result of incremental reform. 
 
The original county structure has its origins in the Middle Ages. These counties are often referred to as the historic, traditional or former counties.

The Local Government Act 1888 created new areas for organising local government that it called administrative counties and county boroughs. These administrative areas adopted the names of, and closely resembled the areas of, the traditional counties. Later legislative changes to the new local government structure led to greater distinction between the traditional and the administrative counties.

The Local Government Act 1972 abolished the 1888 act, its administrative counties, and all county boroughs. In their place, the 1972 Act created new areas for handling local government that were also called administrative counties. The 1972 administrative counties differed distinctly in area from the 1888 administrative counties, which had now been abolished, and from the traditional counties, which had still not been abolished. Many of the names of the traditional counties were still being used now for the 1972 administrative counties. Later legislation created yet further area differences between the 1972 administrative counties and the traditional counties. As of 2021, for the purpose of administration, England outside Greater London and the Isles of Scilly is divided into 83 metropolitan and non-metropolitan counties.

The Lieutenancies Act 1997 created areas to be used for the purpose of the Lieutenancies Act. These newly created areas are called counties and areas for the purposes of lieutenancies, also called 'ceremonial counties' in informal usage, and are based on, but not always the same as, the areas of the 1972 administrative counties.

For the purpose of sorting and delivering mail, England was divided into 48 postal counties until 1996; they were then abandoned by Royal Mail in favour of postcodes.

The term "county", relating to any of its meanings, is used as the geographical basis for a number of institutions such as police and fire services, sports clubs and other non-government organisations.

Scope and structure

Local government 
Cumbria, Hertfordshire, Norfolk, Oxfordshire, Suffolk, Surrey, Warwickshire, West Sussex and Worcestershire are non-metropolitan counties of multiple districts with a county council. In these counties most services are provided by the county council and the district councils have a more limited role. Their areas each correspond exactly to ceremonial counties.

There are six metropolitan counties which are based on the major English conurbations; and they also correspond exactly to a ceremonial county and have multiple districts (commonly referred to as metropolitan boroughs), but do not have county councils. They are Greater Manchester, Merseyside, South Yorkshire, Tyne and Wear, West Midlands and West Yorkshire. In these counties the district councils provide the majority of services. 

Similarly, Berkshire is a non-metropolitan county with no county council and multiple districts. It maps directly to the ceremonial county of Berkshire. 

Bristol, Herefordshire, the Isle of Wight, Northumberland and Rutland are ceremonial counties consisting of a non-metropolitan county of a single district, and are known as unitary authorities.

Cambridgeshire, Derbyshire, Devon, East Sussex, Essex, Gloucestershire, Hampshire, Kent, Lancashire, Leicestershire, Lincolnshire, North Yorkshire, Nottinghamshire, Somerset and Staffordshire are non-metropolitan counties with multiple districts and a county council, where one or more districts have been split off to form unitary authorities. The effect is that the corresponding ceremonial county is larger than the non-metropolitan county of the same name and the county council is responsible for providing services in only part of the ceremonial county. 

In Buckinghamshire, Cornwall, Dorset, Durham, East Riding of Yorkshire, Shropshire and Wiltshire the bulk of the area is a unitary authority which shares the name of the ceremonial county, and the rest of the ceremonial county consists of one or more other unitary authorities.

In total, there are 39 unitary authorities that do not have the same name as any of the ceremonial counties. Bedfordshire, Cheshire and Northamptonshire are ceremonial counties that consist of a number of unitary authorities, none of which has the same name as the ceremonial county. 

The City of London and Greater London are anomalous as ceremonial counties that do not correspond to any metropolitan or non-metropolitan counties, and pre-date their creation.

Institutions
The metropolitan counties have passenger transport executives to manage public transport, a role undertaken by the local authorities of non-metropolitan counties and Transport for London in Greater London.

Large ceremonial counties often correspond to a single police force. For example, the four unitary authorities which make up Cheshire correspond to the same area as the Cheshire Constabulary. Some counties are grouped together for this purpose, such as Northumberland with Tyne and Wear to form the Northumbria Police area. In other areas a group of unitary authorities in several counties are grouped together to form police force areas, such as the Cleveland Police and Humberside Police. Greater London and the City of London each have their own police forces, the Metropolitan Police Service and the City of London Police.

The fire service is operated on a similar county basis, and the ambulance service is organised by the regions of England.

Most ceremonial counties form part of a single region, although Lincolnshire and North Yorkshire are divided between regions. Economic development is delivered using the regions, as is strategic planning.

Comparative areas and populations

As of 2009, the largest county by area is North Yorkshire and the smallest is the City of London. The smallest county with multiple districts is Tyne and Wear and the smallest non-metropolitan county with a county council is Buckinghamshire. The county with the highest population is Greater London and the lowest is the City of London.

Greater London and the metropolitan counties are all in the 15 largest by population and the 15 smallest by area. Greater London has the highest population density, while the lowest is found in Northumberland. By area, the largest ceremonial county consisting of a single-district non-metropolitan county is Northumberland and the smallest is Bristol. By population the largest such county is Bristol and the smallest is Rutland.

Slough is the smallest unitary authority by area that is not also a ceremonial county and Cheshire East is the largest. Hartlepool is the smallest such unitary authority by population and Cheshire West and Chester is the largest. The sui generis Isles of Scilly is smaller both in terms of area and population. The highest population density of any metropolitan or non-metropolitan county is found in Portsmouth and the lowest is found in Northumberland.

History

Origins

Most English counties were established in the Middle Ages sometime between the 7th and 11th centuries. The early divisions form most of the current counties, albeit with adapted boundaries. Counties were used for the administration of justice, the organisation of the military, local government and parliamentary representation.  Some larger counties were divided early on for many purposes, including Yorkshire (into Ridings), Lincolnshire (into Parts) and Sussex (into East and West). In 1832, the Great Reform Act divided larger counties for parliamentary purposes. Changes in the administration of the Poor Law in 1832 and later the implementation of sanitary authorities caused the use of traditional divisions for civil administration to wane. The like-named and broadly similarly shaped registration counties existed for these purposes from 1851 and were used for census reporting from 1851 to 1911. Their boundaries differed from existing counties as they were formed from the combined areas of smaller registration districts, which crossed historic county boundaries.

By the late nineteenth century, there was increasing pressure to reform the structure of English counties. A boundary commission was appointed in 1887 to review all English and Welsh counties, and a Local Government Bill was introduced to parliament in the following year. The resulting Local Government Act 1888 divided the counties into administrative counties, controlled by county councils and independent areas known as county boroughs.

The county councils took over many of the functions of the Quarter Sessions courts, as well as being given further powers over the years. The County of London was created from parts of Kent, Middlesex and Surrey. Each county borough was technically an administrative county of a single district, whilst a number of counties were divided into more than one administrative county; they were Cambridgeshire, Hampshire, Lincolnshire, Northamptonshire, Suffolk, Sussex and Yorkshire.

The counties used for purposes other than local government, such as lieutenancy, also changed, being either a single administrative county or a grouping of administrative counties and associated county boroughs. The one exception was the City of London, which alone among counties corporate retained a separate lieutenancy and although part of the administrative County of London was also a county of itself for all other purposes. In legislation after 1888 the unqualified use of the term "county" refers to these entities, although the informal term "geographical county" was also used to distinguish them from administrative counties. They were shown on Ordnance Survey maps of the time under both titles, and are equivalent to the modern ceremonial counties.

There were considerable boundary changes between the counties over the years, with areas being exchanged and suburban areas in one county being annexed by county boroughs in another. A major realignment came in 1931, when the boundaries between Gloucestershire, Warwickshire, and Worcestershire were adjusted by the Provisional Order Confirmation (Gloucestershire, Warwickshire and Worcestershire) Act which transferred 26 parishes between the three counties, largely to eliminate exclaves.

Proposals and reform

A Local Government Boundary Commission was set up in 1945 with the power to merge, create or divide all existing administrative counties and county boroughs. If the commission's recommendations had been carried out the county map of England would have been completely redrawn. The review process was instead abandoned after the 1950 general election. A Royal Commission on Local Government in Greater London was established in 1957 and a Local Government Commission for England in 1958 to recommend new local government structures.

The major outcomes of the work of the commissions came in 1965: The original County of London was abolished and was replaced by the Greater London administrative area, which also included most of the remaining part of Middlesex and areas formerly part of Surrey, Kent, Essex and Hertfordshire; Huntingdonshire was merged with the Soke of Peterborough to form Huntingdon and Peterborough, and the original Cambridgeshire was merged with the Isle of Ely to form Cambridgeshire and Isle of Ely. A Royal Commission on Local Government in England was set up in 1966 and reported in 1969, and broadly recommended the complete redrawing of local government areas in England, abandoning the existing counties. Due to a change in government, the report did not translate into legislation.

On 1 April 1974, the Local Government Act 1972 came into force. This abolished the existing local government structure of administrative counties and county boroughs in England and Wales outside Greater London, replacing it with a new entirely "two-tier" system. It created a new set of 45 counties, six of which were metropolitan and 39 of which were non-metropolitan. The historic county boundaries were retained wherever it was practicable.

However, some of the counties established by the Act were entirely new, such as Avon, Cleveland, Cumbria, Hereford and Worcester, and Humberside, along with the new metropolitan counties of Greater Manchester, Merseyside, South Yorkshire, Tyne and Wear, West Midlands and West Yorkshire; based on the major conurbations. The counties of Cumberland, Herefordshire, Rutland, Westmorland, Huntingdon & Peterborough and Worcestershire were disestablished. The abolition of the county boroughs resulted in the distinction made between the counties for lieutenancy and those for county councils becoming unnecessary. Section 216 of the Act adopted the new counties for ceremonial and judicial purposes, replacing the previous non-administrative counties.

The Royal Mail was unable to follow the changes to county boundaries in 1965 and 1974 due to cost constraints and because several new counties had names that were too similar to post towns. The main differences were that Hereford and Worcester, Greater Manchester and Greater London could not be adopted and that Humberside had to be split into North Humberside and South Humberside.

Additionally, a number of anomalies were created where villages with a post town in another county took the county of the post town for postal addressing purposes. This meant that for directing the mail, England was divided into a somewhat different set of county boundaries from those established in the reforms. There was also a series of official county name abbreviations sanctioned for use. The use of these postal counties was abandoned by the Royal Mail in 1996.

Further changes

The metropolitan counties ceased to have county councils in 1986 and a further reform in the 1990s allowed the creation of non-metropolitan counties of a single district. These became known as unitary authorities and effectively re-established county boroughs. The reform caused the geographic counties to be defined separately once again, and they became known as ceremonial counties.

As well as unitary authorities covering large towns, some small counties such as Rutland and Herefordshire were re-established as unitary authorities. In 2009 unitary authorities were created to replace each of the county councils of Cornwall, County Durham, Northumberland, Shropshire and Wiltshire. Bedfordshire and Cheshire were thus abolished as non-metropolitan counties but are retained as ceremonial counties, divided between their unitary authorities.

From 2019, further structural changes have been made or are planned.

Culture
There is no well-established series of official symbols or flags covering all the counties. From 1889 the newly created county councils could apply to the College of Arms for coats of arms, often incorporating traditional symbols associated with the county. This practice continued as new county councils were created in 1965 and 1974. However these armorial bearings belong to the incorporated body of the county council and not to the geographic area of the counties themselves. As county councils have been abolished, and unitary authorities have been carved out, some of these symbols have become obsolete or effectively no longer represent the whole ceremonial county. A recent series of flags, with varying levels of official adoption, have been established in many of the counties by competition or public poll. County days are a recent innovation in some areas.

There are 17 first-class men's county cricket teams that are based on historical English counties. These compete in the County Championship and in the other top-level domestic competitions organised by the England and Wales Cricket Board along with the 18th first-class cricket county - Glamorgan in Wales. There are also 19 English minor county teams which, along with a Wales Minor Counties side, compete for the Minor Counties Championship. The County Football Associations are roughly based on English counties, with exceptions such as the combinations of Berkshire and Buckinghamshire and Leicestershire and Rutland.

See also
 List of English counties
 List of ceremonial counties of England by population
 List of two-tier counties of England by population
 List of county councils in England
 List of historic counties of England
 Toponymical list of English counties
 List of the most populated settlements by county

References

 
Politics of England